The Lamalama language, also known by the clan name Mbarrumbathama (Austlang) or Mba Rumbathama, formerly known as  Lamu-Lamu or  Lama-Lama, is a Paman language of Queensland, Australia. Lamalama is one of four languages once spoken by the Lamalama people, the others being Morrobolam (Umbuygamu), Mbariman-Gudinhma, and Umpithamu.

Naming and language relationships
In January 2019, the ISO database changed its reference name to Lamalama, from Lamu-Lamu. , Glottolog calls it Lamalama, while AIATSIS' Austlang database thesaurus heading is Mbarrumbathama language.

Austlang says, quoting linguist Jean-Cristophe Verstraete (2018), that Lamalama, Rimanggudinhma (Mbariman-Gudhinma) and Morrobolam form a genetic subgroup of Paman known as Lamalamic, "defined by shared innovations in phonology and morphology". Within this subgroup, "Morrobolam and Lamalama form a phonologically innovative branch, while Rumanggudinhma forms a more conservative branch".

Further reading
Verstraete, J. (2018). The Genetic Status of Lamalamic: Phonological and Morphological Evidence. Oceanic Linguistics 57(1), 1-30. University of Hawai'i Press.

References 

Paman languages
Extinct languages of Queensland